Albert Legrand Baning (born 19 March 1985) is a Cameroonian footballer who plays as a midfielder.

Baning previously played in countries like China, Switzerland, France, Israel and Bulgaria.

Club career
Baning played for Swiss side FC Aarau before joining his former club Paris Saint-Germain in July 2006. 

His transfer was largely engineered by new team president Alain Cayzac. PSG's coach, Guy Lacombe, has admitted to never actually having seen him play. 

He joined the club RC Strasbourg, 26 January 2010 as a loan.

On 27 June Baning signed a one-year contract with the famous Israeli club of Maccabi Tel Aviv.
On 1 Sep 2010 Maccabi announced that Baning is released from his contract due to mutual consent following an injury he is suffering from.

In early 2014, Baning joined French club Sedan.

International career
True to his name, Baning was sent off twice in three games for Cameroon at the 2008 Beijing Olympics..

References

External links

1985 births
Living people
Footballers from Douala
Cameroonian footballers
Cameroonian expatriate footballers
Footballers at the 2008 Summer Olympics
Olympic footballers of Cameroon
Paris Saint-Germain F.C. players
CS Sedan Ardennes players
Grenoble Foot 38 players
FC Aarau players
Maccabi Tel Aviv F.C. players
PFC Slavia Sofia players
Expatriate footballers in Switzerland
Expatriate footballers in France
Expatriate footballers in China
Expatriate footballers in Israel
Expatriate footballers in Bulgaria
Chinese Super League players
China League One players
Swiss Super League players
Ligue 1 players
Ligue 2 players
Israeli Premier League players
First Professional Football League (Bulgaria) players
Cameroonian expatriate sportspeople in China
Association football midfielders